Shaqrud (also Romanized as Shaqrūd; also known as Shaghrood, Shaqar Rūd, and Shaqrūr) is a village in Ahmadi Rural District, Ahmadi District, Hajjiabad County, Hormozgan Province, Iran. At the 2006 census, its population was 68, in 18 families.

References 

Populated places in Hajjiabad County